Henry Eugene "Jug Head" Smith (September 25, 1905 – December 10, 1979) was an American football guard in the National Football League (NFL). He played college football for the Georgia Bulldogs of the University of Georgia, where he was selected All-Southern. Smith was a member of its "dream and wonder team." He made an all-time Georgia Bulldogs football team picked in 1935. He played in the National Football League (NFL) as a member of the Portsmouth Spartans.

References

1905 births
1979 deaths
Georgia Bulldogs football players
All-Southern college football players
Portsmouth Spartans players
American football guards
Players of American football from Montgomery, Alabama